José María Seoane (13 September 1913 – 7 July 1989) was a Spanish film actor.

Selected filmography
 Autumn Roses (1943)
 Cinnamon Flower (1943)
 Life Begins at Midnight (1944)
 Mariona Rebull (1947)
 The Party Goes On (1948)
 Saturday Night (1950)
 Last Day (1952)
 Two Degrees of Ecuador (1953)
 The Fan (1958)
 The Reprieve (1961)
 Queen of The Chantecler (1962)
 The Blackmailers (1963)
 Assassination in Rome (1965)
 Pedrito de Andía's New Life (1965)
 The Lost Woman (1966)
 The Doubt (1972)
 Nothing Less Than a Real Man (1972)
 The Guerrilla (1973)

References

Bibliography 
 Goble, Alan. The Complete Index to Literary Sources in Film. Walter de Gruyter, 1999.

External links 
 

1913 births
1989 deaths
Spanish male film actors
People from Vigo